Giri Centre or Chaudhary Charan Singh Haryana Agricultural University Sports Complex, is a multi-sports complex in the Chaudhary Charan Singh Haryana Agricultural University located at Hisar city of Haryana state in India. It houses SAI centres of excellence for Athletics, Boxing, Judo, Table tennis and Wrestling. It has an international standard synthetic track athletics track and hockey ground with spectators stands, separate grounds for cricket ground and football ground; an olympic size swimming pool, an indoor badminton stadium with 2 courts, 2 indoor Squash courts, two multipurpose halls with volleyball and Boxing rings and mattresses for the Judo, Wrestling, Table tennis and other indoor sports; 2 indoor gymnasiums; several hobby rooms; and a sports hostel for the visiting and the resident sportspersons.

It is located within CCHAU campus just inside the CCS HAU Gate No. 3 on the MDR107 Balsamand road. Hisar Junction railway station (2.8 km), Hisar Airport (presently domestic, 7.3 km), Indira Gandhi International Airport (182 km), Chandigarh Airport (249 km) and NIS, Patiala (176 km) are the nearest major access points.

Etymology
The sports complex is officially named as the Giri Centre which is named after the India's fourth president, Varahagiri Venkata Giri.

History

 
The construction of Giri Centre started in 1975 and completed in 1978. A sports college was established here in 1978 which was disbanded in 1991 when SAI opened a regional sports training centre here.

In December 2018, the DSW of HAU Students' Welfare signed a partnership agreement with the JSW Group (Jindal Group) under which the Jindal Group will spend  for the enhancement of sports infrastructure and appointment of the technical sports support experts to identify, nurture and develop the sports talent at the Giri Centre in Public–private partnership (PPP) mode.

SAI Sports Training Centre 

SAI Sports Training Centre, HAU Hisar (SAI STC, Hisar) was established in 2001. To train sports person, the Sports Authority of India  (SAI) has established a "Sports Training Center" at HAU with the following "centres of excellence": for imparting training in Athletics, Boxing, Judo, Table tennis and Wrestling (named after Sakshi Malik)., hockey, boxing and judo.
 Centre of excellence for Athletics,
 Centre of excellence for Boxing, 
 Centre of excellence for Hockey, 
 Centre of excellence for Judo, 
 Centre of excellence for Table tennis, 
 Sakshi Malik Centre of excellence for Wrestling, named after the Olympic medalist Sakshi Malik.

Facilities
The complex has the following

 Outdoor stadiums and grounds 
 Combined athletics track and hockey ground with spectators stands and synthetic track of international standards set by the International Association of Athletics Federations and International Hockey Federation
 Cricket ground 
 Football ground
 Outdoor Olympic-size swimming pool with dive platforms of 3 varying heights
 Indoor stadium and arena
 2 indoor badminton courts with spectators stands of 600 seating capacity, 
 2 indoor Squash courts, 
 2 multipurpose halls, 
 2 indoor gymnasiums,
 several hobby rooms.

Events
On 11 November 1975, the stadium hosted a first-class match during the Ranji Trophy tournament at the cricket stadium here between Haryana cricket team and Jammu and Kashmir cricket team.

From 1 to 10 February 2019, the national senior women's hockey championship was held at Giri Centre astrotruf ground for the selection of the national team.

Notable sports persons 
Numerous HAU students and other non-HAU sports person who trained at Giri Centre has achieved fame at international level in the Asian Games, Commonwealth games and Olympic Games.

HAU student sportspersons

Among the HAU students who trained here and became internal medal winners include Gyan Singh, Harcharan Singh, OP, Bhadu, Uday Chand, Jutsi, Vijay Pal.

Other sportspersons
Among the other sportspersons, who were not the HAU students but trained here, include the following:
>
 Boxing 
 Jai Bhagwan
 Manoj Kumar
 Saweety Boora
 Hockey
 Poonam
 Savita Malik
 Wrestling 
 Geetika Jakhar
 Pooja Dhanda

References

See also 
 Mahabir Stadium
 List of Indoor arenas in India 
 List of international cricket grounds in India
 List of stadiums in India
 List of stadiums in Asia

Citatation

External links
 Giri entre Cricket Ground information from the Cricinfo.

Memorials to Chaudhary Charan Singh
Buildings and structures in Hisar (city)
Multi-purpose stadiums in India
Sports venues in Haryana
Cricket grounds in Haryana
Indoor arenas in India
Football venues in Haryana
1978 establishments in Haryana
Sports venues completed in 1978
20th-century architecture in India